Eye Candy may refer to:
 Himbo, a slang term for an attractive but vacuous man

Media
 Eye Candy (album), an album by Mis-Teeq, 2003
 Eye Candy (TV series), a 2015 TV show on MTV starring Victoria Justice
 "Eye Candy" (Happy Tree Friends), a web episode in the animated series Happy Tree Friends